Donald Adam Royal (born May 22, 1966) is an American former professional basketball player, a 6'8" small forward. He played collegiate basketball at the University of Notre Dame, and was selected by the Cleveland Cavaliers in the third round (52nd overall pick) of the 1987 NBA draft. Royal played in eight NBA seasons for five different teams: Minnesota Timberwolves, San Antonio Spurs, Orlando Magic, Golden State Warriors and Charlotte Hornets.

In his NBA career, Royal played in 504 games and scored a total of 3,161 points. His best period as a professional came during the 1992–93 NBA season as a member of the Magic, appearing in 77 games and averaging 9.2 ppg. He was the starting small forward for part of his season with the 1994–95 Orlando Magic. He appeared in the 1995 NBA Finals with the Magic but played only one minute of Game 1.

References

External links
 

1966 births
Living people
African-American basketball players
American expatriate basketball people in Israel
American men's basketball players
Basketball players from Louisiana
Cedar Rapids Silver Bullets players
Charlotte Hornets players
Cleveland Cavaliers draft picks
Golden State Warriors players
Idaho Stampede (CBA) players
Maccabi Tel Aviv B.C. players
Minnesota Timberwolves players
Notre Dame Fighting Irish men's basketball players
Orlando Magic players
San Antonio Spurs players
Small forwards
Sportspeople from New Orleans
St. Augustine High School (New Orleans) alumni
Tri-City Chinook players
21st-century African-American people
20th-century African-American sportspeople